Marzan Kola (also Romanized as Marzān Kolā; also known as Mozrownkolā and Mūrān Kolā) is a village in Bala Khiyaban-e Litkuh Rural District, in the Central District of Amol County, Mazandaran Province, Iran. At the 2006 census, its population was 1,218, in 299 families.

References 

Populated places in Amol County